The 2005 Asian Youth Boys Volleyball Championship was held in Azadi Volleyball Hall, Tehran, Iran from 13 to 19 May 2005.

Pools composition
The teams are seeded based on their final ranking at the 2003 Asian Youth Boys Volleyball Championship.

Preliminary round

Pool A

|}

|}

Pool B

|}

|}

Final round

Quarterfinals

|}

5th–8th semifinals

|}

Semifinals

|}

7th place

|}

5th place

|}

3rd place

|}

Final

|}

Final standing

Team Roster
Arash Keshavarzi, Mohammad Mousavi, Abdolreza Alizadeh, Mansour Zadvan, Saber Narimannejad, Ali Sajjadi, Milad Sadeghi, Ashkan Derakhshan, Vali Nourmohammadi, Ali Najafi, Mostafa Sharifat, Rahman Davoudi
Head Coach: Ahmad Pourkashian

Awards
MVP:  Saber Narimannejad
Best Scorer:  Mansour Zadvan
Best Spiker:  Kang Young-jun
Best Blocker:  Guttikonda Pradeep
Best Server:  Arash Keshavarzi
Best Setter:  Kim Gwang-guk
Best Libero:  Abdolreza Alizadeh

References
 www.asianvolleyball.org

External links
FIVB

A
V
V
Asian Boys' U18 Volleyball Championship